Binnish Subdistrict  is a Syrian Nahiyah (subdistrict) located in Idlib District in Idlib.  According to the Syria Central Bureau of Statistics (CBS), Binnish Subdistrict had a population of 35166 in the 2004 census.

References 

Subdistricts of Idlib Governorate